The Cincinnati Reds' 1987 season resulted in another winning season for the Cincinnati Reds in the National League West. They failed, however, to overcome the Giants and finished in 2nd place for a third consecutive year with a record of 84-78.

Of special note: centerfielder Eric Davis amassed 50 stolen bases in addition to hitting 37 home runs, becoming the first major league player to achieve 30 homers and 50 stolen bases in the same season.

Offseason
November 11, 1986: Chris Welsh was released by the Cincinnati Reds.
February 17, 1987: Wade Rowdon was traded by the Reds to the Chicago Cubs for Guy Hoffman.
March 20, 1987: Derek Botelho was traded by the Cincinnati Reds to the Kansas City Royals for Eddie Tanner (minors) and Pete Carey (minors).
March 23, 1987: Terry Francona was signed as a free agent by the Reds.
March 29, 1987: Max Venable was released by the Reds.

Regular season

Season standings

Record vs. opponents

Transactions
April 9, 1987: Max Venable was signed as a free agent by the Reds.
May 19, 1987: Sal Butera was released by the Reds.
June 2, 1987: Butch Henry was drafted by the Cincinnati Reds in the 15th round of the 1987 amateur draft. Player signed June 30, 1987.
August 26, 1987: Bill Gullickson was traded by the Reds to the New York Yankees for Dennis Rasmussen.

Roster

Player stats

Batting

Starters by position
Note: Pos = Position; G = Games played; AB = At bats; H = Hits; Avg. = Batting average; HR = Home runs; RBI = Runs batted in

Other batters
Note: G = Games played; AB = At bats; H = Hits; Avg. = Batting average; HR = Home runs; RBI = Runs batted in

Pitching

Starting pitchers
Note: G = Games pitched; IP = Innings pitched; W = Wins; L = Losses; ERA = Earned run average; SO = Strikeouts

Other pitchers
Note: G = Games pitched; IP = Innings pitched; W = Wins; L = Losses; ERA = Earned run average; SO = Strikeouts

Relief pitchers
Note: G = Games pitched; W = Wins; L = Losses; SV = Saves; ERA = Earned run average; SO = Strikeouts

Farm system

References

1987 Cincinnati Reds season at Baseball Reference

Cincinnati Reds Season, 1987
Cincinnati Reds seasons
Cinc